George Vassiliadis (born 14 December 1949) is an Australian weightlifter. He competed in the men's bantamweight event at the 1972 Summer Olympics.

References

External links
 

1949 births
Living people
Australian male weightlifters
Olympic weightlifters of Australia
Weightlifters at the 1972 Summer Olympics
Place of birth missing (living people)
20th-century Australian people
21st-century Australian people